Dicraeopetalum is a genus of flowering plants in the family Fabaceae.

Species
Dicraeopetalum comprises the following species:

 Dicraeopetalum capuronianum (M. Peltier) Yakovlev
 Dicraeopetalum mahafaliense (M. Peltier) Yakovlev

 Dicraeopetalum stipulare Harms

References 

Sophoreae
Taxonomy articles created by Polbot
Fabaceae genera